19LIVE86 is the first live album by the Serbian rock band Ekatarina Velika, released in 1987. The album marks EKV's rising popularity following the commercial success of their third album S vetrom uz lice. It was recorded on November 2, 1986, at one of the five sold out performances in the famous Kulušić club in Zagreb.

Track listing
Song arrangements by Ekatarina Velika.

Personnel

Milan Mladenović – vocals, guitar
Margita Stefanović – keyboards, backing vocals
Bojan Pečar – bass, backing vocals
Ivan "Raka" Ranković – drums

External links

Ekatarina Velika live albums
1987 live albums
ZKP RTLJ live albums
Serbian-language live albums